Shirley Marie Watts (born March 6, 1959) is an American lawyer and jurist from Baltimore, Maryland. Since July 2013, she has served as a Judge on the Maryland Court of Appeals, the state's highest court. Watts is the first African American woman to serve as a judge on the Court of Appeals. Prior to her appointment, she was a judge on the Maryland Court of Special Appeals from 2011 to 2013 and an associate judge on the Baltimore City Circuit Court.

Born in Baltimore, Watts received her Bachelor of Arts degree from Howard University in 1980. She earned a Juris Doctor degree from Rutgers School of Law–Camden in 1983. On July 3, 2013, Governor Martin O'Malley nominated Watts to fill the seat of retired Chief Judge Robert M. Bell on the  Court of Appeals, representing the 6th Appellate Circuit (Baltimore City).

References

External links
Biography at Maryland State Archives

1959 births
Living people
African-American judges
Howard University alumni
Lawyers from Baltimore
Judges of the Maryland Court of Appeals
Maryland Court of Special Appeals judges
Rutgers School of Law–Camden alumni
21st-century American judges
21st-century American women judges
21st-century African-American women
20th-century African-American people
20th-century African-American women